Ghigo Agosti (born Arrigo Riccardo Agosti on 10 July 1936 in Milan) is an Italian singer, musician, and composer.

Discography

78rpm

Ghigo and orchestra
 1954 Georgia on My Mind autoproduction-Decca (radio edition US-UK)

45 rpm

Ghigo e gli arrabbiati
 1958 Coccinella/Stazione del rock (limited edition Coca-Cola US - CCPR 01)
 1959 Coccinella/Stazione del Rock (Primary CRA 91782 US-UK-Italy-France-Spain)
 1960 Allocco tra gli angeli/Banana (frutto di moda) (Primary CRA 91797)

Ghigo
 1961 Si titubi, Tu titubi / Tredici vermi col filtro (Primary CRA 91812)
 1961 Banana (frutto di moda) /Coccinella/Stazione del rock/Allocco tra gli angeli (EP President AK308 France).
 1961 Coccinella/Why wait (Coca-Cola - CCPR 02)
 1961 No! Al demonio/Scalogna e carcere (lettera a giuseppe) - (Primary CRA 91797)
 1962 Tredici vermi col filtro/Si titubi, Tu titubi/Allocco tra gli angeli/Banana (frutto di moda) - (EP Primary 5005).
 1962 Babe twist me/Peppermint Twist - (Ri-Fi Italy-UK-France)
 1963 Bella ragazzina di Verona/Solo con me/Dai fà la brava - (EP Primary CRA 91913)
 1963 Georgia on my mind - (RiFi Italy-US-UK-France)

Ghigo e i Goghi
 1964 Ciao/Conosco Jenny/Non avrei mai creduto - (EP Fantasy FS 1007)
 1965 Sunny Afternoon/I'Got you -(inedit on 33rpm 1995 Musicando Italy-Japan)
 1966 Memphis Tennessee/Day dream - (inedit on 33rpm 1995 Musicando Italy-Japan)
 1967 In the midnight hour/Out side - (inedit on 33rpm 1995 Musicando Italy-Japan)

Mister Anima
 1966 Non voglio pietà/Solitude time - (Bluebell BB 3174)
 1967 La mia passeggiata/L'attrazione - (Bluebell BB 3185)

Probus Harlem
 1968 A whiter shade of pale/Hold on I'm coming - (Bluebell BB 3182 Italy-US-UK)
 1968 Homburg/Love, drug and sex - (Bluebell BB 3191 Italy-US-UK)

Rico Agosti
 1968 L'orsacchiotto nero/La Boutique - (Melody MD 603)
 1968 The boutique/Small black bear - (Melody MD 603/A - US e UK)
 1968 Ourson noire/La Boutique - (Melody MD 603/B - France)

Ghigo Agosti
 1969 James Brown dice...io dico!!!/io dico!!! - (Belldisc BD 8027)

Black Sunday Flowers
 1971 Madness/Hot rock - (Bla-Bla BBR 1308) (US-UK-Italy)

33 rpm
 1995 Coccinelle, Banane e altre storie (Musicando Italy-Japan)
 1995 La Cosa (experimental) (Crotalo Italy-Japan)
 1995 Ghigo e i Goghi (inedit 1965-67) (Musicando Italy-Japan)

CD
 1993 Gli avanzi di Ghigo Peer Southern Music
 1996 Frammenti di preghiera Musicando
 1998 Ghigo Coccinella Dv More Record
 2001 Preghiere semplici  Hap (Spain)
 2003 Risveglio in preghiera Hap
 2006 May Gaar Hap
 2007 Pallino blu Hap
 2007 Space sarah Hap

Ghigo Story box CD
 2007 Ghigo, gli Arrabbiati e i Goghi (anthology 1954-1964) Hap
 2007 Goghi, Mister Anima, Rico & Black Sunday Flowers (anthology 1965-1971) Hap
 2007 La Ghigonda ancestrale (anthology 1993-2007) Hap
 2007 Super Live (live anthology 1994-2000) Cocodrilo Records
 2007 L'esperimento (experimental anthology 1993-2007) Hap

Inedit song
 1951 La stazione del blues
 1955 Bocciato (agli esami di riparazione)
 1956 Pallino blu
 1957 La Gufa
 1958 Jenny Jenny Jenny (jenny take a ride)
 1959 I nanetti delle favole col cappuccio rosso fragola
 1960 Carnevale celestiale
 1972 Whole lotta love
 1973 Cantina jam
 1974 Il grillo e la formica

Labels and producers
 Decca (1954) - Paolo Tosi
 Primary (1957–1963) - Gianbattista Ansoldi
 Southern Music (1960–1963) - Alberto Carisch
 Fantasy (1964) - Micky Del Prete
 Bluebell (1966–1967) - Tony Casetta
 Melody (1968) - Federico Monti Arduini
 Bluebell (1968) - Tony Casetta
 Belldisc (1969) - Tony Casetta
 Bla Bla (1971) - Pino Massara
 Toast Records (1988) - Giulio Tedeschi
 Bla Bla (1992) - Pino Massara
 Panarecord (1993) - Peer Southern Music
 Musicando (1995–1996) - Paolo Bertelli
 Dv More records (1998) - John Toso
 Hap (1999–2007) - Tom Cooper
 On sale music - Italo Gnocchi
 Cocodrilo Records (1999–2007) - Luìs Alvàrez

Films
 1961 Allocco tra gli Angeli - starring
 1964 I tre volti - soundtrack arrangement
 1964 Anthar l'invicibile - soundtrack arrangement
 1971 Madness, vacanze per un massacro - motion pictures
 1972 Il caso Mattei - numerary, soundtrack arrangement

References

External links 
  - (official web site)

1936 births
Living people
Italian male singers
Singers from Milan